Freedom Station is a non-profit 501c charitable organization located in San Diego, California whose mission is to assist recovering injured military service members who are awaiting their retirement or discharge from their respective branch of the United States military service.

Freedom Station provides transitional housing along with career and educational guidance to medically retired or discharged military service members who have been injured or disabled during their service to the United States of America.  Freedom Station is supported by volunteers and professionals who help these injured military service members with their transition to civilian life.

Freedom Station officially opened and welcomed its first military service members in May, 2011.

Awards

Freedom station was designated "charity of choice" for the 2011 Holiday Bowl with $1 of every game ticket sold, designated directly to the charity.

Freedom Station was also the co-winner of the 2011 "San Diego County Non-Profit of the Year" by the Veterans Museum and Memorial Center.

References

External links
Official site 

2006 establishments in California
American veterans' organizations
Military-related organizations
United States military support organizations